Wen Zhifang (born 25 September 1960) is a Chinese sport shooter who competed in the 1984 Summer Olympics and in the 1988 Summer Olympics.

References

1960 births
Living people
Chinese female sport shooters
ISSF pistol shooters
Olympic shooters of China
Shooters at the 1984 Summer Olympics
Shooters at the 1988 Summer Olympics
Shooters at the 1986 Asian Games
Asian Games medalists in shooting
Asian Games gold medalists for China
Asian Games silver medalists for China
Medalists at the 1986 Asian Games